The 1984 NCAA Division I Field Hockey Championship was the fourth women's collegiate field hockey tournament organized by the National Collegiate Athletic Association, to determine the top college field hockey team in the United States. The Old Dominion Lady Monarchs won their third consecutive championship, defeating the Iowa Hawkeyes in the final. The championship rounds were held at Stagg Field in Springfield, Massachusetts.

Bracket

References 

NCAA Division I Field Hockey Championship
Field Hockey
NCAA
1984 in sports in Massachusetts
Women's sports in Massachusetts